Manuel Bulnes Pinto (July 10, 1842 – April 18, 1899) was a Chilean military and political figure.

Bulnes was born in Santiago, the son of President Manuel Bulnes Prieto and of First Lady Enriqueta Pinto Garmendia, who in turn was the daughter of President Francisco Antonio Pinto and sister of future President Aníbal Pinto. He studied at the Colegio de los Padres Franceses and later moved to Paris, where he completed three years of law before returning to Chile.

In 1867, Bulnes joined the Chilean Army as commander of a civic regiment organized and financed by himself.  At the head of his regiment, he waged a continuous warfare against the Araucanian Indians in southern Chile, and in 1874 he joined the regular army ranks as a Sergeant major. He married Elena Calvo Cruchaga in 1877.

Manuel Bulnes was elected a deputy for Mulchén in 1879. At the beginning of the War of the Pacific, he organized a cavalry squadron that they named Escuadrón de Carabineros de Yungay, but the transport Rimac where they were traveling to the theater of operations was captured en route by the Peruvian Navy and they were interned as prisoners of war in the city of Tarma. Himself and his squadron were later freed via prisoner exchange, and they fought at the battles of Tacna, Chorrillos and Miraflores.

After the war, he went in a government commission to Europe, where he was during the 1891 Chilean Civil War. He supported the congressional side and was rewarded with the promotion to Brigade General. He returned to Chile in 1894, where he became Secretary and later Chief of the Army General Staff. In 1896 he was named Minister of War and Navy by President Federico Errázuriz Echaurren.  In the short lapse while he held the post (from September 18 to November 26), he managed to regularized the army lists, giving legal equality to all who had ever served under the colors. He died in Santiago on 1899.

External links and sources
Official biography 

1842 births
1899 deaths
People from Santiago
Chilean people of Asturian descent
Chilean people of Portuguese descent
Conservative Party (Chile) politicians
Chilean Ministers of Defense
Deputies of the XIX Legislative Period of the National Congress of Chile
Chilean Army generals
Chilean military personnel of the War of the Pacific
People of the Chilean Civil War of 1891